Wong Shek (Chinese: 黃石), or Wong Ma Tei (Chinese: 黃麻地), is an area in the northern part of the Sai Kung Peninsula in Hong Kong. It is under the administration of Tai Po District. In the area, there are picnic facilities with views of the sea. However, to protect the natural environment of Wong Shek, the Government controls the number of vehicle entering the area; a gate is set up at Pak Tam Chung on the way towards Wong Shek, which only allows permitted vehicles to enter. There is also a public pier called "Wong Shek Pier".

"Wong shek" means "yellow rock" in Cantonese.

Transportation 
The most common way to reach Wong Shek is by bus. There are several bus routes that go to the Wong Shek Pier.

Kowloon Motor Bus 
 Route 94 - from Sai Kung Bus Terminus
 Route 96R - from Diamond Hill station (Sundays & Public Holidays only)
Route 289R - from Wong Shek Pier (One-way only to Shatin; Sundays & Public Holidays 3-7pm)

Kai-to 
 Ma Liu Shui - Tap Mun (via Wong Shek) 
 Wong Shek - Tap Mun
 Wong Shek - Wan Tsai / Chek Keng

See also 
 Sai Kung Town
 Sai Kung Peninsula
Sai Kung Country Park
Tap Mun

References

External links  

 The Jockey Club Wong Shek Water Sports Centre
 Wong Shek Campsite
 Wong Shek Tree Walk

Tai Po District
Places in Hong Kong
Sai Kung Peninsula